The year 1881 in architecture involved some significant architectural events and new buildings.

Buildings and structures

Buildings

 Alþingishúsið in Reykjavík, Iceland, designed by Ferdinand Meldahl, is opened to house the Althing (national parliament)
 British Museum (Natural History) in London, England, designed by Alfred Waterhouse, is opened
 Founder's Building at Royal Holloway College, Egham in England, designed by William Henry Crossland, is completed
 Tweed Courthouse is completed by Leopold Eidlitz in New York City
 The National Theatre (Prague), designed in 1865–68 by Josef Zítek, is opened officially
 Construction of St Stephen's Church, Bournemouth, England, designed by John Loughborough Pearson, is begun

Awards
 RIBA Royal Gold Medal – George Godwin.
 Grand Prix de Rome, architecture: Henri Deglane.

Births
 March 29 – Raymond Hood, American Art Deco architect (died 1934)
 August 2 – Walter Godfrey, English architectural historian and architect (died 1961)
 date unknown – Nikolai Ladovsky, Russian avant-garde architect and educator, leader of the rationalist movement in 1920s architecture (died 1941)

Deaths
 January 25 – Konstantin Thon, official architect of Imperial Russia during the reign of Tsar Nicholas (born 1794)
 April 20 – William Burges, English architect and designer (born 1827)
 December 14 – Decimus Burton, English architect and garden designer (born 1800)
 December 18 – George Edmund Street, English architect (born 1824)

References

Architecture
Architecture
Years in architecture
19th-century architecture